is a railway station on the Takayama Main Line close to the city of Toyama, Toyama Prefecture, Japan, operated by West Japan Railway Company (JR West) and Central Japan Railway Company (JR Central). The station is the boundary for the two railway companies. Therefore, JR Central crews working on Toyama-bound "Hida" Limited Express services will get off here and JR West crews will take over the remaining journey. JR West crews working on Nagoya or Ōsaka-bound "Hida" Limited Express services will get off here and JR Central crews will take over the remaining journey.

Lines

Station layout
The station has a single island platform serving two tracks, connected to the station building by a level crossing. The station is unattended.

Platforms

Adjacent stations

History

The station opened on 27 November 1930. With the privatization of Japanese National Railways (JNR) on 1 April 1987, the station came under the control of JR West.

Surrounding area
Jinzū River
National Route 41

See also
 List of railway stations in Japan

External links

  

Railway stations in Japan opened in 1930
Railway stations in Toyama Prefecture
Stations of West Japan Railway Company
Stations of Central Japan Railway Company
Takayama Main Line